German Sveshnikov (11 May 1937 – 9 June 2003) was a Soviet fencer. He won a gold medal in the team foil event at the 1960 and 1964 Summer Olympics and a silver in the same event at the 1968 Games.

References

1937 births
2003 deaths
Russian male fencers
Soviet male fencers
Olympic fencers of the Soviet Union
Fencers at the 1960 Summer Olympics
Fencers at the 1964 Summer Olympics
Fencers at the 1968 Summer Olympics
Olympic gold medalists for the Soviet Union
Olympic silver medalists for the Soviet Union
Sportspeople from Nizhny Novgorod
Olympic medalists in fencing
Medalists at the 1960 Summer Olympics
Medalists at the 1964 Summer Olympics
Medalists at the 1968 Summer Olympics